Alexandre Dumas (1802–1870) was a French writer best known for his historical novels of high adventure.

Alexandre Dumas may also refer to:

Alexandre Dumas, fils (1824–1895), French author and dramatist, natural son of the above
Thomas-Alexandre Dumas (1762–1806), French general, father and grandfather of the two above, respectively
Alexandre Dumas (merchant) (c. 1726–1802), Canadian businessman, merchant, and politician
Alexandre Dumas (Paris Métro), station on Paris Métro Line 2

Dumas, Alexandre